LXTV is a production unit of NBCUniversal that creates lifestyle and entertainment content. Started in 2006 by former MTV executives Morgan Hertzan and Joseph Varet as a privately owned broadband TV network and website, LXTV was acquired in January 2008 by NBC Owned Television Stations.  LXTV was an early pioneer of original digital web video, which they transitioned into nationally syndicated television shows after the NBC acquisition.

Some of LXTV's programs include 1st Look, Open House, Open House NYC and George to the Rescue, which presents lifestyle programming to a young affluent audience.

LXTV also created and launched New York Live (formerly LX New York), the live, daily lifestyle show on WNBC, broadcast from Studio 3K in 30 Rockefeller Plaza and live from the streets in and around New York.

History 
Originally branded as Code.TV, and focused on web distribution, the production company's founders rebranded themselves as "LXTV"  Before rebranding, Code.TV launched a one-time Web video following around a 23-year-old analyst named A.J. who worked at an investment bank as he went out on an extravagant night on the town, in which he described as "models and bottles." A.J.'s lavish lifestyle, colorful personality and catchphrase went viral and became instant Web fodder, getting picked up by sites like "Gawker," "New York Times" and the "New York Sun". 

LXTV was acquired in January 2008 by Local Media After NBC Weather Plus was shut down in late 2008, WNBC launched a replacement programming of local information, news and livestyle as NBC New York Nonstop in March 2009 using LXTV programs. In late 2010 and early 2011, eight more NBC O&O stations adopted the Nonstop digital subchannel format including the three California as one network. Each stations' Nonstop subchannel has eight hours of local programming along with core programming from affiliated production company's, LXTV: Talk Stoop, First Look and Open House. On September 23, 2019, NBCU Owned Television Stations launched its LX digital news brand for original content for which LXTV would provide programming.

Programming
1st Look is a weekly national lifestyle show on NBC that features exclusive restaurants, shopping, fashion, nightlife and entertainment. The show is hosted by Johnny "Bananas" Devenanzio. Former hosts include Ali Fedotowsky, Maria Sansone, and Pedro Andrade.
In Wine Country was a program produced by KNTV in 2002 which highlighted wine culture and other events in the Napa Valley; it also aired as part of the NBC late night schedule on weekends and predated LXTV's existence.
Open House and Open House NYC are weekly luxury real estate shows on NBC, highlighting the best in real estate and interior design across the nation, hosted by Sara Gore. 
George to the Rescue is a weekly national home improvement show on NBC, starring George Oliphant. George and his team of contractors and interior designers travel the nation rescuing the homes of deserving people.
On the Rocks is a reality series following the nationwide search for the best and brightest mixologists to showcase their style, personality and skills behind the bar. Shot on location in Las Vegas and Los Angeles and hosted by Maria Sansone, "On the Rocks" features a seasoned panel of judges who determine the fate of bartenders competing to win the grand prize of $100,000 and the title "America's Top Bartender." The show started as a Web series and later became a television program airing on NBC.
My First Time is an Emmy-award-winning documentary series highlighting individuals embarking on a major event for the first time in their lives. Past specials have focused on the New York City Marathon, the Winter Olympics, the Tribeca Film Festival and the Academy Awards. 
Match Off was a reality series following two matchmakers competing to find the perfect love match for the same client. Each week, for seven weeks, two new matchmakers compete to find love for their client. 
 I Do! was a television series in 2008 about the realities and dramas of planning and throwing a wedding, highlighting the latest trends in weddings, from couture cakes to luxury table settings.

References

External links 
 
 1stLookTV.com
 OpenHousetv.com
 GeorgeToTheRescue.com

NBCUniversal
Internet properties established in 2006
Mass media companies established in 2006
Television channels and stations established in 2006
Television channels and stations established in 2019
2008 mergers and acquisitions